Bhagawanth Khuba (born 1 June 1967) is an Indian politician currently serving as the union Minister of State for Chemicals and Fertilizers, New and Renewable Energy in Government of India since from 7 July 2021. He is a Member of the Lok Sabha from Bidar Lok Sabha constituency in Karnataka since from May 2014. He is a member of the Bharatiya Janata Party.

Life and background
Khuba was born in Aurad to Gurubasappa Khuba and Mahadevi Khuba on 1 June 1967. He is a B.E. in Mechanical Engineering from Siddaganga Institute of Technology, Tumkur. He married Sheela Khuba on 9 May 1999, with whom he has a son and two daughters. He is an agriculturist and does social work.

Controversies
The Hyderabad Karnataka Janapara Sangarsha Samiti has criticised Khuba for supposed bias towards Maharashtra for getting its new rail lines and not making enough effort to secure a rail division for Kalaburagi.

References

1967 births
Living people
India MPs 2014–2019
People from Bidar district
Lok Sabha members from Karnataka
Bharatiya Janata Party politicians from Karnataka
India MPs 2019–present